Nikolsk is a rural locality (a selo) in Mukhorshibirsky District, Republic of Buryatia, Russia. The population was 1,309 as of 2010. There are 20 streets.

Geography 
Nikolsk is located 45 km northeast of Mukhorshibir (the district's administrative centre) by road. Khonkholoy is the nearest rural locality.

References 

Rural localities in Mukhorshibirsky District